Almunge is a locality situated in Uppsala Municipality, Uppsala County, Sweden with 813 inhabitants in 2010. The narrow-gauge heritage railroad Upsala-Lenna Jernväg has a stop in Almunge.

References 

Populated places in Uppsala County
Populated places in Uppsala Municipality